Lavandula pinnata (sometimes called fernleaf lavender ) is a species of flowering plant in the mint family, Lamiaceae, native to southern Madeira and the Canary Islands (Lanzarote). It was first described in 1780.

Description
Lavandula pinnata is a small shrub with opposite, simple, pinnately dissected leaves, and square stems. The flowers are purple, borne in summer.

Taxonomy
, the original authorship of the name "Lavandula pinnata" varies by source. The World Checklist of Selected Plant Families attributes the name to Johan Daniel Lundmark in 1780, a view followed by The Plant List and Tropicos. GRIN Taxonomy and the African Plant Database attribute the name to the younger Carl Linnaeus (1780); the International Plant Names Index has the same attribution, but without a date, as well as noting the use of the name by Conrad Moench in 1802.

References

pinnata
Flora of Madeira
Flora of the Canary Islands
Garden plants of Europe
Drought-tolerant plants